Garfield County is the name of several counties in the United States:

Garfield County, Colorado 
Garfield County, Montana 
Garfield County, Nebraska 
Garfield County, Oklahoma 
Garfield County, Utah 
Garfield County, Washington

Defunct
Garfield County, Kansas